Gregory Edward Hemphill (born 14 December 1969) is a Scottish-Canadian comedian, actor, writer, and director. He is best known for his work with Ford Kiernan on the BBC Scotland comedy series Chewin' The Fat (1999–2005) and Still Game (2002–2007, 2016–2019). Hemphill was Rector of the University of Glasgow (2001–2004).

Personal life
Hemphill was born in Glasgow, Scotland, the son of Edward, a chartered accountant, and Anne Hemphill (née Brophy) a teacher. The family left Scotland in the mid 1970s, and he spent much of his childhood in Montreal, Quebec, Canada, which has contributed to his distinctive accent, Scottish-Canadian. He returned to Scotland in the late 1980s to study at the University of Glasgow, where he achieved an MA Honours Degree in theatre, film and television. He is married to actress Julie Wilson Nimmo, best known for playing Miss Hoolie in Balamory. They got married in a hot air balloon whilst flying over Las Vegas in 1999. The couple have two sons together. They live in Elie, Fife.

He is a keen fan of professional wrestling from childhood as well as a Celtic season-ticket holder. During his time in Canada, he gained an appreciation for ice hockey and baseball, supporting the Montreal Canadiens and Toronto Blue Jays.

University of Glasgow
Hemphill was elected Rector of the University of Glasgow in March 2001. He was one of five candidates and narrowly defeated Alasdair Gray for the post. He completed his three-year term in 2004, and was widely praised for taking an active interest in the role.

Career

Early career
Hemphill has appeared in several projects. In 1990, he performed at the Edinburgh Fringe with Rab Christie and Neil Warhurst as the "Trio Brothers Troup", where they won the 1990 "So You Think You're Funny" trophy. He continued his stage work, appearing in the 1992 God Plus Support performance and in the popular 1995 Only an Excuse? tour. He also ventured into radio as the original presenter of football show, Off the Ball on BBC Radio Scotland and Eddie Mair Live.

Hemphill and Kiernan scripted seven episodes between 1999 and 2000, for then popular children's television show Hububb. These were, Lullabubb, Top of the Bubbs, Conquer Leserest, Casual-Tea, Bubb Goes Boo, 2010: A Space Bubbsy and No Go Pogo. He guest starred alongside Kiernan in one episode, which he also scripted with Kiernan, Casual-Tea. However, his best known performances are alongside Ford Kiernan in the television sketch show Chewin' the Fat and its spin off, Still Game. In series three of Still Game, Hemphill's brother Steve has a cameo as a CN Tower lift operative.

Still Game
Following the success of Chewin' The Fat, Kiernan and Hemphill wrote Still Game. Still Game was based on the original play that the pair wrote for the Edinburgh Festival in 1997. The Characters Jack Jarvis and Victor McDade had appeared throughout the four series of Chewin' The Fat. Six series, and four specials were broadcast between 2002 and 2007.

In 2014, Still Game returned, with a live show at The SSE Hydro, where Hemphill reunited with Ford Kiernan. The show was a sell out, and featured the whole original cast Paul Riley, Mark Cox, Jane McCarry, Sanjeev Kohli and Gavin Mitchell. The series returned to television screens on BBC One in October 2016.

Kiernan and Hemphill announced another live show for SSE Hydro in 2017.

Other Work
Hemphill appeared in the Scottish Gaelic-language drama, Eilbheas, in which Hemphill played the spirit of Elvis set in the Western Isles. It was first shown on the launch night of BBC Alba. He has also written Appointment with the Wicker Man with Donald McLeary for the National Theatre of Scotland, a stage production about a small community's attempts to produce a musical version of The Wicker Man.

Hemphill has been involved in the Scottish wrestling scene, matched against actor, comedian and writer, Robert Florence. They played bitter rivals at "Kelvin Brawl" in the Glasgow's Kelvin Hall on 21 June 2013. Comedian Frankie Boyle became part of this venture, unmasking himself at the end of the match.

Hemphill guest starred in an episode of the award-winning children's television programme Katie Morag in 2014, playing the part of Donald John Cameron.

Hemphill is currently starring as Mr Sawdust in the CBeebies television series Olga da Polga alongside his wife Julie Wilson Nimmo.

In 2022, Greg starred in a television programme called  'Jules' and Greg's Wild Swim' about wild swimming with actress-wife Julie Wilson Nimmo which aired on New Years Day 2023 on BBC Scotland and BBC iPlayer.

In March 2023, Greg featured on an BBC Scotland documentary as part of the broadcaster celebrating 100 years of broadcasting alongside wife Julie Wilson Nimmo and Still Game co-star Sanjeev Kohli.

Directing 
In 2016, alongside Donald McLeary, Hemphill wrote the script for the horror/comedy film West Skerra Light. At a length of one hour, this was his first full-length drama as a film director. In 2017, alongside Hopscotch Films, Hemphill was involved in directing the black comedy ghost-hunting drama Long Night at Blackstone. It is due to be screened on BBC ONE Scotland on 2 April.

References

External links
https://m.imdb.com/name/nm0376157

Anglophone Quebec people
Living people
Male actors from Glasgow
Male actors from Montreal
Rectors of the University of Glasgow
Scottish comedy writers
Scottish emigrants to Canada
Scottish film producers
Scottish male comedians
Scottish male radio actors
Scottish male television actors
Scottish radio presenters
Scottish television writers
Writers from Glasgow
Writers from Montreal
Comedians from Glasgow
Comedians from Montreal
People from Springburn
British male television writers
1969 births
Scottish nationalists